Tamarack/Osceola Smelter was a copper smelter jointly built by the Tamarack and Osceola mining companies in 1888 in Dollar Bay, Michigan.  The smelting was merged in 1891 with the Detroit and Lake Superior Company to form the Lake Superior Smelting Company.

See also
Copper mining in Michigan
List of Copper Country smelters

Notes

Metallurgical facilities in Michigan
Buildings and structures in Houghton County, Michigan